Pachasniyuq (Quechua pachas gypsum, -ni, -yuq suffixes, "the one with gypsum", Hispanicized spelling Pachasnioc) is a mountain in the Huancavelica Region in Peru, about  high. Pachasniyuq lies southwest of Walla Q'asa and southeast of K'uchu Urqu.

References 

Mountains of Peru
Mountains of Huancavelica Region